Holy water is deeply rooted tenet in the Ethiopian Orthodox Tewahedo Church, believed to able cast demons and cure illed people effectively. Water can be poured to person or drinking are the main practice for "healing toxic". Various monasteries also renowned for holy water provision where many Ethiopian Christians make pilgrims to acquire. In addition, holy water is important at Timkat (Epiphany) celebration where priests set up holy water and blessed to baptize the Christians for "purifying souls from sins".

Purposes
The Ethiopian Orthodox Tewahedo Church considered holy water a healer from demons and illed people. The water also should to be consumed for removal of "harmful things inside stomach". Studies shows that majority Ethiopians prefer traditional healings such as holy water to biomedical services for major illness, particularly for mental illness. 98% belief based on traditional healings of holy water. Holy water also associated with HIV AIDS healer; in particular by using antiretroviral therapy (ART) together with holy water remaining controversial among research participants. Many people go to holy water sites for treatment such as monasteries, with 5,000 pilgrims held daily and cure process include way of prayer, consumption and bathing. Visitors often fill their bottle or jerrycans with holy water and consume it at home. In Lalibela, the use of traditional healings method is common. An estimated 5,000 people moved to Entoto Church where holy water also existed and majority engulfed to renowned Tsadkane Mariam Monastery.

In celebration
Holy water popularly used in public holiday such as Timkat (Epiphany), in which Christians gathered in small water pool set by priests during Ketera (an eve of Timkat). After priests and deacons prayed and bless the holy water, the water sprayed on the people to "purify souls from the skin committed". Most of these events took place at Jan Meda Square. In Gondar, the Fasilides Bath represents Jordan River. At the eve, local people flock the city into the bath with eight of forty-four tabots arrived in all directions.

References

Religion in Ethiopia
Ethiopian Orthodox Tewahedo Church